Josef Ludl (3 June 1916 – 1 August 1998) was a Czech football player. He played for Czechoslovakia, for which he played 16 matches and scored six goals.

He was a participant in the 1938 FIFA World Cup.

In his country he played for FK Viktoria Žižkov and AC Sparta Prague. He scored 128 league goals.

References 
 Story at AC Sparta Praha official website
 ČMFS entry

1916 births
1998 deaths
People from Mladá Boleslav District
People from the Kingdom of Bohemia
Czech footballers
Czechoslovak footballers
1938 FIFA World Cup players
FK Viktoria Žižkov players
AC Sparta Prague players
Czechoslovakia international footballers
Czech football managers
Czechoslovak football managers
SK Kladno managers
FC Hradec Králové managers
Association football forwards
Sportspeople from the Central Bohemian Region